Irina Vladimirovna Zhuk (born 3 December 1966) is a Russian ice dancing coach and a former competitor for the Soviet Union. With Oleg Petrov, she is the 1985 Skate America silver medalist.

Personal life 
Irina Vladimirovna Zhuk was born on 3 December 1966 in Kharkiv, Ukrainian SSR, Soviet Union. She is married to former Soviet ice dancer Alexander Svinin.

Career 
Zhuk competed with Oleg Petrov for the Soviet Union. Together, they won gold at the 1984 Grand Prix International St. Gervais, silver at the 1984 Nebelhorn Trophy, and silver at the 1985 Skate America. After retiring from competition, they performed in ice shows in England and the United States. 

In collaboration with Alexander Svinin, Zhuk began working as a coach and choreographer at Moscow's Sokolniki ice rink. In 2010, they accepted an offer to move to a new rink, Mechta in the Bibirevo District of Moscow.

Zhuk and Svinin's current students include:
 Alexandra Stepanova / Ivan Bukin
 Sofia Shevchenko / Igor Eremenko
 Elizaveta Shanaeva / Devid Naryzhnyy
 Sofya Leonteva / Daniil Gorelkin

Their former students include:
 Rebeka Kim / Kirill Minov
 Jana Khokhlova / Sergei Novitski
 Daria Morozova / Mikhail Zhirnov
 Ekaterina Rubleva / Ivan Shefer
 Ekaterina Pushkash / Jonathan Guerreiro (May 2009 – spring 2010)
 Anastasia Shpilevaya / Grigory Smirnov
 Valeria Starygina / Ivan Volobuiev
 Valeria Loseva / Denis Lunin
 Eva Khachaturian / Igor Eremenko
 Anna Yanovskaya / Ivan Gurianov

Competitive highlights 
(with Petrov)

References

External links 

Soviet female ice dancers
Russian figure skating coaches
1966 births
Living people
Sportspeople from Kharkiv
Honoured Coaches of Russia
Female sports coaches